Luck of Roaring Camp is a 1937 American western film directed by Irvin Willat and starring Owen Davis, Charles Brokaw and Joan Woodbury. It is based on the 1868 story The Luck of Roaring Camp by Bret Harte. It was shot at the Iverson Ranch in California.

Cast
 Owen Davis Jr. as Davy
 Charles Brokaw as 	Don Oakhurst
 Joan Woodbury as Elsie
 Sheila Bromley as Susan Oakhurst
 Ferris Taylor as Judge Brandt
 Bob Kortman as Yuba Bill 
 Charles King as Sandy
 Byron Foulger as 	Kentuck
 Robert McKenzie as Tuttle

References

Bibliography
 Pitts, Michael R. Western Movies: A Guide to 5,105 Feature Films. McFarland, 2012.

External links
 

1937 films
1937 Western (genre) films
American black-and-white films
American Western (genre) films
Films directed by Irvin Willat
Monogram Pictures films
1930s English-language films
1930s American films